Wyeth Glacier is in North Cascades National Park in the U.S. state of Washington, in a cirque to the west and north of Storm King, a peak  northwest of Goode Mountain.

See also
List of glaciers in the United States

References

Glaciers of the North Cascades
Glaciers of Chelan County, Washington
Glaciers of Washington (state)